Kerry Hudson (born 1980, Aberdeen) is a British writer. She has lived in London and Berlin and currently lives in Prague.

Published works
Lowborn: Growing Up, Getting Away and Returning to Britain's Poorest Towns (2019)
Thirst (2014)
Tony Hogan Bought Me An Ice Cream Float Before He Stole My Ma (2012)

Translations into French 
2012: Tony Hogan bought me an ice-cream float before he stole my ma
2013: – translated into French under the title  Tony Hogan m'a payé un ice-cream soda avant de me piquer maman by Florence Lévy-Paoloni, Paris, 298 p. 
2012: – Finalist of the Guardian First Book Award
2014: Thirst 
2015 – translated into French under the title La Couleur de l'eau by Florence Lévy-Paoloni, éditions Philippe Rey, 346 p. 
2015: – prix Femina étranger.

References

External links 
 Tara Lennart, "Irish Cauchemar", Gonzai.
 Sabine Audrerie, "Kerry Hudson reçoit le Prix Fémina étranger", La Croix.
 Laura Barnett: "Kerry Hudson interview: 'To keep writing is a dream come true'", The Guardian, 13 July 2014
 Lesley McDowell, "Book reviews: Thirst by Kerry Hudson", The Scotsman, 19 July 2014.
 Official website

1980 births
Living people
Scottish women novelists
21st-century Scottish writers
21st-century Scottish novelists
Prix Femina Étranger winners
Writers from Aberdeen
21st-century Scottish women writers
Writers from Berlin